John Charles Eichinger (born February 18, 1972) is an American serial killer who was convicted of killing three women and one child from 1999 to 2005 in Pennsylvania, which he committed after two of the victims had rejected his romantic advances. He was handed three death sentences for the latter murders and one life sentence for the former and is currently awaiting execution.

Early life
John Charles Eichinger was born on February 18, 1972, in Malvern, Pennsylvania, as one of four brothers. He attended the Upper Merion Area High School in King of Prussia, where he was part of a large group of friends who would play Dungeons & Dragons in their spare time. Through this activity, he became acquainted with Jennifer Still and Heather Greaves, developing a romantic interest in both women. After graduation, he found work as a clerk at a local Acme supermarket, where he worked alongside Greaves. He was noted for playing in local chess tournaments in his spare time.

Murders
On July 6, 1999, Eichinger, donning a pair of rubber gloves and carrying a large knife under his jacket, went to Still's home in Bridgeport to confess his feelings towards her. To his dismay, she rejected his advances, stating that she would not leave her fiancé. Enraged by her rejection, Eichinger pulled out the knife and repeatedly stabbed her, ultimately cutting her throat before leaving the house. In the subsequent investigations, police questioned Still's boyfriend and friends, including Eichinger, who claimed that he had been in New Jersey at the time of the murders. In an attempt to ward the police off his trail, he claimed that two other Dungeons & Dragons players might have information about the murder, with one being heavily involved in Wicca. As the investigators had no evidence to connect him with the murder at the time, they focused on the players mentioned by Eichinger, until a DNA swab proved that they were innocent.

After the murder, Eichinger stored the bloodied knife, clothing, and rubber gloves he had worn on the day of the murder in his room as a keepsake to remind him of the killing. For the next five years, when Halloween came about, he would take out the knife and don a mask of Ghostface from the horror franchise Scream, and would go out trick-or-treating with them. Around 2003, he moved to his parent's new home in Somers Point, New Jersey, where he transferred to work at a local Acme supermarket.

On March 25, 2005, Greaves ordered some purple flowers for her upcoming birthday and arranged for Eichinger to deliver them at her home in King of Prussia. Bringing the knife with him, Eichinger went to the house and confessed his feelings for Greaves. After being rejected again, he pulled out the knife and started stabbing her before finishing her off by slitting her throat. The act was noticed by Greaves' 21-year-old sister Lisa and 3-year-old daughter, Avery, who were in at the house at the time. Unwilling to leave any witnesses, Eichinger went to the bathroom and stabbed Lisa to death before catching up to Avery in the hallway and killing her. He then started walking back to his car, where a neighbor of Greaves' observed him with bloodied clothes and a rag tied around his hand. The Greaves' father discovered the victims' bodies when he returned home from work.

Arrest, trial, and imprisonment
As the killings heavily resembled Still's murder years prior, authorities looked into whether the four victims had any connections. After learning that Still and Greaves had been mutual friends with each other and with Eichinger, Detective Richard Nilsen was dispatched to interrogate him at his workplace in Somers Point. Initially, Eichinger denied responsibility, claiming that the scratches on his arm were the result of a dog bite and a cut sustained while he was taking out the trash and that he had been at a boardwalk in Ocean City when the killings took place. However, when he noticed that Nilsen was carrying a gun on him, Eichinger decided to confess to the four killings, bizarrely stating that he followed company policy to "never resist a man with a gun."

Not long after, Eichinger waived his right to an extradition hearing and was extradited to Pennsylvania, where he was charged with four counts of capital murder. He confessed to the four murders before the judge, arguing that he should be given a life sentence in light of mitigating evidence presented by his lawyers: these included claims that he suffered from schizoid personality disorder and that he was under extreme emotional duress when he committed the crimes, relating to the recent death of his father from Alzheimer's disease. These claims were contested by the prosecutors, who pointed that the defendant had no prior history of mental illness, had planned his crimes in advance and the murders of Lisa and Avery were done to get rid of witnesses.

In the end,  Eichinger was found guilty on all counts and was given three death sentences for the murders of the Greaves family; he was given a life term for Still's murder. At the sentencing phase, the victims' family members exclaimed that they hoped they would live long enough to see Eichinger executed for the murders. Since his incarceration, he has attempted to appeal his sentence on multiple occasions. Still, each time, his appeals have been denied. In 2008, Eichinger's death warrant was signed by Governor Ed Rendell, but the sentence is yet to be carried out.

A notice of execution was signed on January 9, 2023, by the Pennsylvania Department of Corrections Acting Secretary George Little. The notice sets March 7, 2023, as Eichinger's execution date.

In the media and culture
Eichinger's crimes were covered in two separate crime documentary series, both aired on Investigation Discovery: Homicide City as an episode titled Deadly Circle of Friends and In Ice Cold Blood as an episode titled Dungeons, Dragons and Death.

See also
 Capital punishment in Pennsylvania
 List of death row inmates in Pennsylvania
 List of serial killers in the United States

References

External links
 Commonwealth v. Eichinger (2007)
 Eichinger v. Wetzel (2019)

1972 births
20th-century American criminals
21st-century American criminals
American male criminals
American murderers of children
American people convicted of murder
American prisoners sentenced to death
American prisoners sentenced to life imprisonment
American serial killers
Criminals from Pennsylvania
Living people
Male serial killers
People convicted of murder by Pennsylvania
People from Malvern, Pennsylvania
Prisoners sentenced to death by Pennsylvania
Prisoners sentenced to life imprisonment by Pennsylvania
Violence against women in the United States